is a Japanese politician of the Democratic Party of Japan, a member of the House of Representatives in the Diet (national legislature). A native of Matsumoto, Nagano and graduate of Shinshu University, he was elected for the first time in 2003 after an unsuccessful run in 2000.

References

External links 
  in Japanese.

1955 births
Living people
People from Matsumoto, Nagano
Members of the House of Representatives (Japan)
Democratic Party of Japan politicians
21st-century Japanese politicians